The Dubova mine is a large chromium mine located in western Romania in Mehedinți County, close to Dubova. Dubova represents one of the largest chromium reserves in Romania having estimated reserves of 2 million tonnes of ore grading between 38% and 52% chromium metal.

References 

Chromium mines in Romania